Álvaro Rodríguez Brachi (born 6 January 1986) is a Spanish former professional footballer who played as a right-back.

Club career

Spain
Born in Seville, Andalusia, Brachi only played lower league football in his country, representing the reserve teams of both Real Betis and RCD Espanyol.

He spent two seasons in the Segunda División B, being relegated in 2007–08 and 2009–10 with Espanyol B.

Anorthosis and Videoton
In the summer of 2010, Brachi joined Anorthosis Famagusta F.C. on loan. His debut in professional football took place on 29 August, as he came on as a late substitute in a 3–2 away win against Alki Larnaca FC in the Cypriot First Division.

Subsequently, Brachi spent four years in Hungary at the service of Videoton FC, signing at the same time as compatriot Héctor Sánchez. He was regularly played by Paulo Sousa– a total of 39 matches in his first two years in the Nemzeti Bajnokság I – but, after his replacement with fellow Portuguese coach José Gomes, became a fringe player.

Brachi left Videoton on 30 June 2015.

Domžale
Brachi signed for NK Domžale in January 2016, after responding to an advertisement from the Slovenian club posted on LinkedIn.

Personal life
Brachi's father, Gabino Rodríguez, was also a footballer. He too played for Betis.

Club statistics

References

External links

Beticopedia profile 
Videoton official profile 
Stats at HLSZ 

1986 births
Living people
Spanish footballers
Footballers from Seville
Association football defenders
Segunda División B players
Tercera División players
Betis Deportivo Balompié footballers
RCD Espanyol B footballers
CD Utrera players
Cypriot First Division players
Anorthosis Famagusta F.C. players
Nemzeti Bajnokság I players
Fehérvár FC players
Slovenian PrvaLiga players
NK Domžale players
Spanish expatriate footballers
Expatriate footballers in Cyprus
Expatriate footballers in Hungary
Expatriate footballers in Slovenia
Spanish expatriate sportspeople in Cyprus
Spanish expatriate sportspeople in Hungary
Spanish expatriate sportspeople in Slovenia